Stod is a former municipality in the old Nord-Trøndelag county in Norway. The  municipality existed from 1838 until 1964. It originally encompassed the northern part of what is now the municipality of Steinkjer, stretching from the town of Steinkjer to the northeast, along the lake Snåsavatnet, to the municipal border with Snåsa. Over time, however, the municipality was reduced in size to just a fraction of its original size, leaving just the area between the Snåsavatnet in the north to the Ogndalen valley in the south. The administrative centre of the municipality was the village of Binde. The main church for Stod was For Church, located just south of the administrative center. The local sports team is Stod IL.

Stod is best known for rock carvings in the Bølareinen field that are approximately 6000 years old. The carvings are of animals and humans. There are several other prehistoric sites, including two stone circles, one on the Nordgård farm and one at the rectory, both of which are partially destroyed.

Traditionally, agriculture and forestry were the major industries in Stod, but construction of the Nordlandsbanen railway line brought with it new jobs and a dairy. Today most residents of Stod work in the town of Steinkjer.

History
The parish of Stod was established as a municipality on 1 January 1838 (see formannskapsdistrikt law). On 23 January 1858, the growing village of Steinkjer was established as a kjøpstad (town) with a population of 1,150. The new town was separated from the municipality of Stod to constitute its own municipality leaving Stod with 3,471 residents. On 1 January 1869, the western district of Egge (population: 941) was separated from Stod to form its own municipality. This left Stod with 2,530 inhabitants. On 1 January 1909, the northern district of Kvam (population: 1,169) became a separate municipality, leaving Stod with 934 inhabitants.

During the 1960s, there were many municipal mergers across Norway due to the work of the Schei Committee. On 1 January 1964, a large merger took place: the neighboring municipalities of Beitstad (population: 2,563), Egge (population: 3,476), Kvam (population: 1,245), Ogndal (population: 2,678), Sparbu (population: 4,027), and Stod (population: 1,268) were all merged with the town of Steinkjer (population: 4,325) to form the new municipality of Steinkjer.

Name
The municipality (originally the parish) is named after the local dialect expression  which means "ledge", "waterfall", or "depression". It could also be referring to the ridge near the local church.

Government
While it existed, this municipality was responsible for primary education (through 10th grade), outpatient health services, senior citizen services, unemployment, social services, zoning, economic development, and municipal roads. During its existence, this municipality was governed by a municipal council of elected representatives, which in turn elected a mayor.

Municipal council
The municipal council  of Stod was made up of 13 representatives that were elected to four year terms. The party breakdown of the final municipal council was as follows:

Mayors
The mayors of Stod from 1838 until 1964:

1838–1843: Peder Rasmus Lyng
1844–1845: Thomas Balchen 
1846–1847: Martin Hannestad
1848–1851: Jonas Haugum 
1852–1855: Ole O. Rygg 
1856–1859: Peter Taraldsen 
1860–1861: Ole Lægran
1862–1867: Jakob Haugum 
1868–1869: Ole Anton Qvam 
1870–1877: Adolf Bødtker 
1878–1881: Christian Elden
1882–1883: Henrik Østgaard
1884–1889: Peter Følling (V)
1890–1891: Erik A. Næstvold
1892–1895: Ole Kristian Forfang (V)
1896–1907: Peter Følling (V)
1908–1910: Arne Vollan (RF)
1911–1919: Andreas Lillevestre (V)
1920–1922: John Tiltnes (Bp)
1923–1925: Albert Fredrik Eggen (V)
1926–1928: Sverre Andreassen Lillevestre (Bp)
1929–1931: Olaf Hatling (Bp)
1932–1934: Sverre Andreassen Lillevestre (Bp)
1935–1937: Kaspar Flekstad (LL)
1938–1940: Albert Fredrik Eggen (V)
1941–1942: Georg Høin (NS)
1943–1945: Nikolai Valøen (Bp)
1946–1947: Sverre Binde (Bp)
1948–1951: Olav Molberg (V)
1952–1955: Einar Ystgård (Bp)
1956–1959: Olav Molberg (V)
1960–1963: Alf Hatling (Sp)

See also
List of former municipalities of Norway

References

Steinkjer
Former municipalities of Norway
1838 establishments in Norway
1964 disestablishments in Norway